Schoenionta is a genus of longhorn beetles of the subfamily Lamiinae, containing the following species:

 Schoenionta breuningi Siess, 1974
 Schoenionta dehiscens (Aurivillius, 1911)
 Schoenionta ichneumonoides Breuning, 1954
 Schoenionta javanicola Breuning, 1954
 Schoenionta macilenta (Pascoe, 1867)
 Schoenionta merangensis Breuning, 1954
 Schoenionta necydaloides (Pascoe, 1867)
 Schoenionta philippinica Breuning, 1954
 Schoenionta strigosa (Pascoe, 1867)
 Schoenionta vespiventris Thomson, 1868

References

Saperdini